The Texas Tech Red Raiders basketball team represents Texas Tech University in basketball. Texas Tech competes in NCAA Division I, and has been a charter member of the Big 12 Conference since its first season in 1996. The team previously competed in the Border Conference and Southwest Conference. The team was founded in 1925, having since won 13 regular season conference championship, and made 19 appearances in the NCAA tournament as of the 2021–22 season. Since 1999, the Red Raiders have played their home games at the United Supermarkets Arena on the university's campus in Lubbock, Texas.

History

1925–1935
Texas Tech's basketball program was founded the same year the school opened its doors in 1925. The inaugural game was a 37–25 loss to Daniel Baker College. Tech would lose two more games before finally clinching their first ever victory—35–21 at Sul Ross University.

Grady Higginbotham was the first coach, earning a 14–18 record over two seasons. Until Pat Knight, Higgenbotham was the only Tech basketball coach to garner an overall losing record (.438) during his stay. Following Higgenbotham's departure, Victor Payne led the Matadors (as the school's teams were known until 1936) from 1927 to 1930. His final tally stood at 32 wins and 20 losses. W. L. Golightly coached only one season, bringing in an 11–9 record. Dell Morgan held the head coaching job from 1931 to 1934, chalking up 42 wins to 29 losses. He was followed by Virgil Ballard. Though Ballard coached only a single season, it was during his time that the team won their milestone 100th game, a one-point victory over House of David. Ballard left with a 15–9 record.

1935–1971
Berl Huffman was twice the head basketball coach at Texas Tech—first from 1935 to 1942 and then from 1946 to 1947. During his total of eight seasons, he garnered a record of 121–67. Polk Robison was the only other person to serve two different times as the head basketball coach at the school. When Huffman left in 1942, Robison took the job. And, when Huffman left a second time in 1947, it was Robison who again filled the position, this time remaining until 1961. At a total of 18 seasons, his stay is the second longest of any Red Raiders basketball coach, behind Gerald Myers. He departed after leading his teams to 254 wins, 195 losses, and the first two NCAA tournaments in school history.

Gene Gibson followed Robison into the position. In his eight seasons, he chalked up the second best conference record in Texas Tech history and led the Raiders to a Southwest Conference Championship in 1962. Bob Bass led the program to a 22–15 record over a season-and-a-half before returning to professional basketball coaching duties.

1971–2001
Gerald Myers became coach of the Red Raiders mid-year during the 1970/71 season and stayed until 1991. His stay was the longest of any head basketball coach at Tech, and several milestones were passed during his tenure, including wins #600 (TCU), #700 (SMU), #800 (at SMU), and #900 (Texas A&M). With a Texas Tech career record of 326–261, Myers has more wins with the Red Raiders than any other men's basketball coach in school history. Myers led Tech to 16 winning seasons, two Southwest Conference championships, three SWC tournament titles, and four NCAA tournament berths. Myers served as the school's athletic director from 1996 to 2011.

James Dickey replaced Myers as head coach prior to the 1991/92 season and would remain at Texas Tech until his dismissal at the end of the 2000/01 season. During his 10 seasons at Texas Tech, Dickey amassed a 166–124 win–loss record (164–123 with vacated games omitted). The program also won its 1,000th game under Dickey—a 71–62 victory at UALR.

Dickey took over a Texas Tech program that had finished with a 13–45 combined record over Myers' final two years and led his first team to a winning season and fifth-place finish in Southwest Conference play, after having been picked to finish last in the conference. In his second year as head coach, the Red Raiders won the Southwest Conference tournament championship, the school's fourth, to secure the league's automatic bid to the NCAA tournament. Texas Tech finished the 1994/95 season with a 20–10 record, sharing the SWC regular season championship with Texas and earning a berth in the 1995 National Invitation Tournament. In the SWC's final season, Dickey's 1995–96 Red Raiders produced one of the most successful seasons in school history and one of the more memorable seasons in the history of the conference, finishing 30–2 overall and undefeated in conference play, winning both the SWC regular season championship and the conference tournament title, advancing to the "Sweet Sixteen" in the NCAA Tournament, and finishing #8 in the AP poll and #10 in the Coaches' Poll.

The Raiders moved to the Big 12 for the 1996/97 season, and appeared to pick up right where they left off with a solid 19–9 season. For all intents and purposes, however, Dickey's tenure ended on the first day of the inaugural Big 12 basketball tournament. During the Raiders' first-round game, it was discovered that two players had played the entire season while academically ineligible. Hours after that game, Texas Tech announced that it was withdrawing from postseason consideration and forfeiting its entire conference schedule. The Raiders had lost that game, and would have had to forfeit it if they had won. A subsequent investigation revealed massive violations dating back to 1990 in men's basketball and nine other sports. As a result, the NCAA stripped Tech of its two NCAA tournament wins in 1996 and docked it nine scholarships over four years. Dickey was unable to recover from the lost scholarships, and his Red Raiders finished with four consecutive losing seasons, during which they only won a total of 18 games in Big 12 play. He was fired after his 2000/01 team produced a 9–19 overall record.

Bob Knight era: 2001–2008
Bob Knight served as the Texas Tech men's basketball head coach from 2001–2008.

Hired in March 2001 to replace James Dickey as head coach, Bob Knight quickly improved the program, which had not received a bid to the NCAA tournament nor achieved a winning record since 1996. Knight led the Red Raiders to three NCAA Tournament appearances and one NIT appearance in his first four years at Texas Tech, including an appearance in the Sweet Sixteen in 2005. Texas Tech finished the 2005/06 season with a 15–17 overall record, marking the only time that Knight finished a complete season at Tech with a losing record and fewer than 21 wins. During the 2005–06 season, the ESPN reality TV show centering on Knight and the Red Raiders, Knight School, was filmed. The Red Raiders recovered in 2006/07, finishing 21–13 and again earning a bid to the NCAA Tournament, where they would lose to Boston College in the first round. In both 2006 and 2007, Knight's Texas Tech teams defeated two top 10-ranked teams in consecutive weeks. During Knight's first six years at Texas Tech, the Red Raiders won 126 games, an average of 21 wins per season.

On New Year's Day 2007, Texas Tech recorded a 70–68 defeat of New Mexico to give Knight his 880th career victory, making him the highest winning coach in men's college basketball history.

On January 16, 2008, Knight registered his 900th career victory when the Red Raiders upset the ninth-ranked Texas A&M Aggies, 68–53. Knight won two more games as head coach—against Missouri and Oklahoma State—prior to announcing his retirement on February 4, 2008, after having led his 2007–08 team to a 12–8 mid-season record. His son Pat Knight, the head coach designate since 2005, was immediately named as his successor. The younger Knight stated that, after many years of coaching, his father was exhausted and ready to retire.

Bob Knight finished with an overall win–loss record of 138–82 at Texas Tech.

Pat Knight era: 2008–2011

After assuming the head coaching role midseason, Pat Knight's initial two games were defeats on the road. The first was an 80–74 loss to Baylor on February 6, 2008. The second came three days later at Nebraska. Knight's first head coaching win came at home when the Red Raiders upset #18 Kansas State, 84–75, at United Spirit Arena. Going into the game, KSU was in sole possession of first place in the Big 12. On March 1, 2008, the Red Raiders again defeated the top team in the conference by beating #5 Texas, 83–80, ending a month-long, eight-game winning streak for the Longhorns.

The Red Raiders finished the regular season with back-to-back losses, first at Kansas and then to Baylor. At the 2008 Big 12 men's basketball tournament, they added another loss—to Oklahoma State—in the first round. The team did not receive an invitation to play at either the NCAA Division I Men's Basketball Championship or at the National Invitation Tournament. Texas Tech did get an invitation to the inaugural College Basketball Invitational, but declined the offer.

In the third game of the 2008–09 season, Tech defeated Division II opponent East Central 167–115, setting a new school record for most points scored in a game. The previous record of 128 was set in the double overtime victory over Texas on February 20, 1994. The combined total of 282 points also became a new record.

On March 7, 2011, Texas Tech terminated Knight's position as head coach. He left with an overall record of 50–61, becoming the second coach in the school's history to depart with more losses than wins.

Billy Gillispie era: 2011–2012
Billy Gillispie became the head coach of the team on March 20, 2011. He only stayed for one season before resigning on September 21, 2012, in the wake of a school investigation into his treatment of his players.

Tubby Smith era: 2013–2016

Tubby Smith was hired to replace interim head coach Chris Walker on April 1, 2013, after 6 seasons as head coach of Minnesota. Smith's first season showed some signs of progress, with Texas Tech picking up its first victory over a top-25 team since 2009. Texas Tech's victory over the then #12 Baylor Bears was the first win over a ranked opponent since December 2009, when the team defeated #10 Washington. Smith would later earn another top 25 upset with a victory over #19 Oklahoma State on February 8, 2014. Following outreach by Smith and the athletic department, Texas Tech students broke both school and Big 12 Conference records for student attendance at the United Spirit Arena during a February 25, 2014, loss to Kansas State. The record of 6,086 students fell less than 2,000 short of the national record.

The Red Raiders ended Smith's first season with a home victory over the Texas Longhorns, but the Raiders fell to Oklahoma State in the first round of the Big 12 tournament in March. They ended the season with a 14–18 overall record, Smith's first losing season as a head coach. 

Under Smith, the 2015–2016 Red Raiders finished 9–9 in Big 12 play and advanced to their first NCAA Tournament in nine years, earning an 8-seed in the East Regional. Their season ended in the Round of 64 with a loss to the 9-seed Butler Bulldogs.

Following the season, the Smith era came to an end as Smith resigned on April 14 to coach the Memphis Tigers.

Chris Beard era: 2016–2021
Texas Tech hired former Arkansas-Little Rock coach Chris Beard on April 15, 2016, a week after he was appointed to the same position at UNLV. In his second season at the helm, Texas Tech reached the Elite Eight for the first time in school history, with a 78–65 win over the Purdue Boilermakers, where they lost to the eventual national champions, Villanova Wildcats, 71–59.

With a share of the Big 12 regular season title, the Red Raiders returned to the NCAA Tournament in 2019 as a #3 seed. Their second trip to the Elite Eight in as many years saw them defeat #1 seed Gonzaga Bulldogs 75–69, clinching their first ever Final Four appearance. They proceeded to defeat the Michigan State Spartans 61–51, reaching their first-ever national title game, where they ultimately lost to another #1 seed, the Virginia Cavaliers, 85–77 in overtime, ending the most successful season in school history.

Beard departed the program after the 2020–21 season, to take the head coaching job at his alma mater, the University of Texas. Given the rivalry between the two schools, Texas Tech athletic director Kirby Hocutt later remarked, "Had he gone to any other university, he'd be celebrated. But there's just certain things you cannot do, and one of them is you can't leave Texas Tech for Texas."

Mark Adams era: 2021–2023
Mark Adams, a Texas Tech alumnus and longtime coach around West Texas who had served as Beard's assistant for the last six seasons, was elevated to head coach on April 5, 2021. The Dustin R. Womble Basketball Center, a new 58,000-square foot, $32.2 million practice facility for the men and women's basketball teams, was inaugurated a month later. Coach Adams swept former coach Chris Beard and the University of Texas in his first season at the helm. 

On March 5, 2023, Texas Tech University announced that they have suspended Coach Adams for using "racially insensitive" terms and possibly spitting on a player; Corey Williams led the team in the Big 12 tournament. On March 8, Adams resigned his position.

Postseason

NCAA tournament results
The Red Raiders have appeared in the NCAA tournament 19 times. However, they have "officially" appeared in 18 tournaments; their 1996 appearance was vacated. Their combined record is 19–20 (17–19 without vacated games).

On April 6, 2019, Texas Tech earned their first trip to the NCAA tournament championship game with a Final Four win over Michigan State. Two days later, the Red Raiders lost the NCAA tournament championship game in overtime 85–77 to Virginia.

(*) indicates overtime game

NIT results
The Red Raiders have appeared in the National Invitation Tournament (NIT) four times. Their combined record is 6–4.

NAIA tournament results
The Red Raiders have appeared in the NAIA tournament two times. Their combined record is 3–2.

Season-by-season results

Home arenas

The Red Raiders play their home games at United Supermarkets Arena located on the university campus. The Red Raiders previously played at Lubbock Municipal Coliseum until United Supermarkets Arena opened in 1999. The university's first team, then known as the Matadors, did not have a home court but instead played at the Livestock Judging Pavilion until a wood and stucco barn was constructed the following season.

Texas Tech students broke both school and Big 12 Conference records for student attendance at the United Supermarkets Arena during a February 25, 2014, loss to Kansas State. The record of 6,086 students fell less than 2,000 short of the national record.

Players

AP All Americans

Conference Player of the Year

All Conference first team

All tournament team

Ring of Honor
Texas Tech does not retire jersey numbers, but they do honor players with a Ring of Honor.

Individual awards
Chip Hilton Player of the Year Award
Ronald Ross, 2004–05
Frances Pomeroy Naismith Award
Bubba Jennings, 1984–85

Head coaches

References

External links